Andika Ramadiansyah (born 6 January 1998) is an Indonesian badminton player affiliated with the PB Djarum club.

Achievements

BWF International Challenge/Series 
Mixed doubles

  BWF International Challenge tournament
  BWF International Series tournament
  BWF Future Series tournament

Performance timeline

Indonesian team 
 Junior level

Individual competitions 
 Senior level

References

External links 
 

1998 births
Living people
People from Bogor
Sportspeople from West Java
Indonesian male badminton players
21st-century Indonesian people